The Itamaraty Palace, also known as the Palace of the Arches (Palácio dos Arcos), is the headquarters of the Ministry of Foreign Affairs of Brazil. It is located in the national capital of Brasília. The building was designed by architect Oscar Niemeyer and  inaugurated on April 21, 1970. It is located to the east of the National Congress building along the Ministries Esplanade, near the Praça dos Três Poderes (Three Powers Plaza).

In Brazil, Itamaraty is generally used as a metonymy for the Ministry of Foreign Affairs. The name stems from that of the palace in Rio de Janeiro which was the headquarters of the ministry before the Brazilian capital and government were moved to Brasília.

Gallery

See also
 List of Oscar Niemeyer works

References

 A arquitetura do Palácio Itamaraty (1959-1970) Rossetti, Eduardo Pierrotti. Ministry of External Relations of Brazil. Retrieved on 2012-03-27. .

Foreign relations of Brazil
Buildings and structures in Brasília
Oscar Niemeyer buildings
Government buildings completed in 1970